Fabio Ponsi (born 12 February 2001) is an Italian football player. He plays for  club Modena.

Club career
Ponsi was raised in the youth system of Fiorentina and was first called up to Fiorentina's senior squad late in 2020.

On 20 July 2021, Ponsi signed a three-year contract with Modena in Serie C. Modena was promoted to Serie B for the 2022–23 season.

Career statistics

International career
Ponsi was included in Italy's squad for the 2018 UEFA European Under-17 Championship, but remained on the bench in all games.

References

External links
 

2001 births
People from Pietrasanta
Sportspeople from the Province of Lucca
Footballers from Tuscany
Living people
Italian footballers
Italy youth international footballers
Association football defenders
ACF Fiorentina players
Modena F.C. 2018 players
Serie C players
Serie B players